is a 1970 Japanese erotic drama film directed by Akio Jissoji. The film won the Golden Leopard at the Locarno International Film Festival. Its English title is This Transient Life.

Cast
 Ryō Tamura as Masao (brother)
 Michiko Tsukasa as Yuri (sister)
 Kozo Yamamura as father
 Kin Sugai as mother
 Kotobuki Hananomoto as Iwashita (the servant)
 Akiji Kobayashi
 Eiji Okada as Mori (the sculptor)
 Mitsuko Tanaka as Mori's second wife
 Isao Sasaki as Mori's Son
 Minori Terada
 Haruhiko Okamura as Ogino (Buddhist priest)

References

External links
 

1970 films
1970 drama films
1970s erotic drama films
Japanese erotic drama films
1970s Japanese-language films
Japanese black-and-white films
Films directed by Akio Jissoji
Golden Leopard winners
1970s Japanese films